The statue of Milan Rastislav Štefánik is an outdoor sculpture by Bohumil Kafka, installed outside Štefánik's Observatory on Petřín in Prague, Czech Republic.

External links

 

Monuments and memorials in Prague
Outdoor sculptures in Prague
Petřín
Sculptures of men in Prague
Statues in Prague